The Bourgeois Government (Regering-Bourgeois) was the Flemish Government formed following the 2014 Flemish Parliament election. The cabinet consisted of a centre-right coalition of the nationalist New Flemish Alliance (N-VA), the Christian Democratic and Flemish party (CD&V) and the Open Flemish Liberals and Democrats (Open Vld). It had a large majority in the Flemish Parliament and the main opposition parties were the Socialist Party (sp.a), which had been part of nearly all previous governments in recent history, and the Green party.

As Flemish Minister-President Geert Bourgeois was elected to sit in the European Parliament following the 2019 European Parliament election in Belgium, he vacated his place in the government to fellow N-VA member Liesbeth Homans, who was sworn in on 2 July 2019 to lead the interim Homans Government composed of the same parties, as a new coalition based on the 2019 Belgian regional elections had not yet been formed.

Formation

After the 2014 elections, N-VA and CD&V started negotiations to form a Flemish Government. However, since Open Vld was required for a Federal Government majority and they demanded to be in either both or neither government, they joined the negotiations later.

Composition
The Bourgeois Government consisted of the following nine ministers:

Replacements
 Minister Annemie Turtelboom resigned on 29 April 2016. She was replaced by Bart Tommelein, then secretary of state in the federal Michel Government.
 In January 2019, Bart Tommelein becomes mayor of Oostende. He was replaced by Lydia Peeters taking over the function of Minister of Finance, Budget and Energy, while minister Sven Gatz took over the position as vice minister-president for the Open Vld.
 In February 2019, Joke Schauvliege resigned following fierce criticism of her earlier statement where she described the climate demonstrations as a "set up game". Schauvliege was replaced by Koen Van den Heuvel.

Politics of Flanders